Black Box 149 is a play by Australian playwright Rosemary Johns.

Plot
An account of the grounding of British Airways Flight 149 at Kuwait International Airport during the Iraqi invasion of Kuwait in 1990.

First production
Black Box 149 was first produced at La Mama Theatre, Melbourne, on 15 September 2011, as part of the 2011 Melbourne Fringe Festival, with the following cast:
Pilot: Dennis Coard
Man: Majid Shokor
Director: Matt Scholten
Dramaturgical Adviser: Julian Meyrick
Set Design and Graphics: Peter Mumford
Stage Manager/Operator: Benjamin Morris
Audiovisuals: Brett Ludeman

Reception
Black Box 149 was included on the 2012 Victorian Certificate of Education drama syllabus, and was presented at the 2012 9th Women Playwrights International Conference. It was also selected and performed at Nuremberg as part of the Australia now Germany program 2017.

References

External links
Library holdings of 2012 book of the play

Australian plays
2011 plays
Docudrama plays